Rosemary Casals and Martina Navratilova were the defending champions but lost in the semifinals to Larisa Savchenko and Natasha Zvereva.

Patty Fendick and Jill Hetherington won in the final 7–5, 3–6, 6–2 against Savchenko and Zvereva.

Seeds
Champion seeds are indicated in bold text while text in italics indicates the round in which those seeds were eliminated.

 Larisa Savchenko /  Natasha Zvereva (final)
 Patty Fendick /  Jill Hetherington (champions)
 Gigi Fernández /  Eva Pfaff (first round)
 Elise Burgin /  Rosalyn Fairbank (first round)

Draw

References
 1989 Virginia Slims of California Doubles Draw

Silicon Valley Classic
1989 WTA Tour